Ekta Kundansingh Bisht is an Indian cricketer.  She plays as a slow left-arm orthodox bowler. She was the first international woman cricketer from Uttarakhand. She was also the first cricketer for India to take a hat-trick in a Women's Twenty20 International match.

Early life
Ekta Bisht was born on 8 February 1986 in Almora, Uttar Pradesh (now in Uttarakhand) to Kundan Singh Bisht and Tara Bisht. Her father, Kundan Singh Bisht, retired from the Indian Army in 1988 at the rank of Havaldar. Ekta Bisht has three elder siblings, Kaushal Bisht, Vineet Bisht and Shweta Bisht. Bisht began playing cricket at the age of six. She would play the sport with boys, which often drew an audience as she was the only girl on a male team. She was the captain of Kumaon University in North zone. The family's finances improved after Ekta was selected for the national team in 2011, and began receiving funding from sponsors. Following an increase in her father's Army pension, the family was able to close the tea stall.

Career
Bisht played for Uttar Pradesh between 2006–07 and 2012–13. She was the captain of Kumaon University in North zone. She had been mentored by Liyakat Ali in her early years, who coached Uttaranchal Women's Cricket Association team from 2003 to 2006.

Bisht was selected for the India women's national cricket team in 2011, and made her WODI debut on 2 July 2011 against Australia.

On 3 October 2012, Bisht took a hat-trick as India outplayed during the match of the ICC World Women Twenty20 played in Colombo, Sri Lanka. India has restricted Sri Lanka to a modest 100 for eight after Bisht claimed a hat-trick in the last over. Bisht was part of the Indian team to reach the final of the 2017 Women's Cricket World Cup where the team lost to England by nine runs.

In December 2017, she was named as one of the players in both the ICC Women's ODI Team of the Year and the ICC Women's T20I Team of the Year. She was the only woman named in both squads.

In October 2018, she was named in India's squad for the 2018 ICC Women's World Twenty20 tournament in the West Indies.

During the 2017 Women's Cricket World Cup, Bisht claimed 5 wickets in 18 runs against Pakistan, leading India to win by 95 runs. With this, she broke her own record of 5 wickets in 8 runs against Colombo in February, the same year. It is said that 12 years back (2005)m in the same setup, she was injured and had to leave the match midway. But in  2017 she redeemed herself  with her historical win.

As of November 2018, she has had 79 ODI wickets and 50 T20I wickets averaging 21.98 and 14.50 respectively.

Bisht was also Joint second highest wicket taker in ODI's in 2017 at an average of 17.27 with 29 wickets in 16 matches.

She is the fifth Indian woman to cross the 100 wicket mark with 129 international wickets and India's fifth highest wicket taker in ODI's & third highest in T20I's. She is also praised by Sachin Tendulkar for her fielding skills, who also happens to be her favorite cricketer.

In May 2021, she was named in India's Test squad for their one-off match against the England women's cricket team. In January 2022, she was named as one of three reserve players in India's team for the 2022 Women's Cricket World Cup in New Zealand.

Awards 
In November 2017, the Uttarakhand government decided to confer the year's Khel Ratna award to bowler Ekta Bisht and Dronacharya Award to her coach Liyakat Ali Khan.

References

External links

Female Cricket interviews Ekta Bisht

1986 births
Living people
Cricketers from Uttarakhand
Indian women cricketers
India women Test cricketers
India women One Day International cricketers
India women Twenty20 International cricketers
Uttar Pradesh women cricketers
Railways women cricketers
Uttarakhand women cricketers
IPL Trailblazers cricketers
IPL Velocity cricketers
Women's Twenty20 International cricket hat-trick takers